Daera may refer to:

 Daaera, a 1953 Hindi film 
 Department of Agriculture, Environment and Rural Affairs, Northern Ireland